is a Japanese professional footballer who plays as a winger or a forward for Sagan Tosu and the Japan national team.

Club career
Iwasaki started with junior sides Kaneshiro JFC and the JFA Academy of Fukushima, before enrolling at the Hikone Municipal Central Secondary School and later, Kyōtotachibana High School. In August 2016, it was announced that Iwasaki would sign for Kyoto Sanga. He made an assist on his debut against Montedio Yamagata.

National team career
In May 2017, Iwasaki was elected Japan U-20 national team for 2017 U-20 World Cup. At this tournament, he played all 4 matches.

Career statistics

Club

Notes

Honours

International

Japan U-19
AFC U-19 Championship 2016

References

External links

Profile at Kyoto Sanga

1998 births
Living people
Association football people from Shiga Prefecture
Japanese footballers
Japan youth international footballers
J2 League players
J1 League players
Kyoto Sanga FC players
Hokkaido Consadole Sapporo players
Shonan Bellmare players
JEF United Chiba players
Sagan Tosu players
Association football forwards
Footballers at the 2018 Asian Games
Asian Games silver medalists for Japan
Asian Games medalists in football
Medalists at the 2018 Asian Games